Córdoba, also called Cordova in English, is one of the 50 provinces of Spain, in the north-central part of the autonomous community of Andalusia. It is bordered by the  Andalusian provinces of Málaga, Seville, Jaén, and Granada, the Extremaduran province of Badajoz and the province of Ciudad Real, which is part of the autonomous community of Castile-La Mancha. Its area is 13,769 km2.

History
A royal decree of 30 November 1833, created the Province of Córdoba (along with 48 other provinces), which was formed by joining the towns of the Kingdom of Córdoba and the following towns until then located in Badajoz: Belalcázar, Fuente la Lancha, Hinojosa del Duque, and Villanueva del Duque.

Population development
The historical population is given in the following chart:

Geography

Overview
The province is mainly divided into three geographical areas: the Sierra Morena to the north, the Baetic Depression in the center and La Campiña in the south. The climate is continental Mediterranean with temperatures in the capital ranging from 9.2 °C in January and 27.2 °C in July and August, which often exceed 40 °C. Rainfall in the capital is recorded from 600 to 750 mm per year. It is concentrated from October to April. The Province of Córdoba ranks 11th in Spain in which the entire population is concentrated in the capital. On average, 31.96% of a Spanish province's population inhabits its capital. The province consists of 75 municipalities. They are further grouped into 8 "comarcas".

Its population is 799,402 (2014), of whom more than 40% live in the capital, Córdoba, and its population density is 58.06/km2. The Province of Córdoba contains 75 municipalities. The province has three natural parks: Sierra de Cardeña y Montoro Natural Park, Sierra de Hornachuelos Natural Park, and Sierras Subbéticas Natural Park. The University of Córdoba was founded in 1972.

The province's capital city is a well-known tourist destination. Mezquita was built using pillars of uneven heights. The city was declared a world heritage site in 1984.

Comarcas 
 Alto Guadalquivir
 Campiña Este - Guadajoz
 Campiña Sur
 Subbética
 Valle de los Pedroches
 Valle del Guadiato
 Vega del Guadalquivir

See also 
 List of municipalities in Córdoba
 Cordoba Cathedral

References

External links 

  Travel Guide to Cordoba Province
  Page About Francisco Munoz